SS Mary Cassatt was an American Liberty ship built in 1943 for service in World War II. Her namesake was Mary Cassatt, an American painter and printmaker.

Design 

Most Liberty ships were named after prominent deceased Americans.

Construction and career 
The keel of the ship was laid on April 17, 1943. Few months later the Kaiser Permanente Metals launched in Los Angeles under the name Mary Cassatt. She was transferred to the Soviet Union later that year to be commissioned with the name Odessa. The ship survived the World War II unscathed.

The ship was not returned to the United States and remained in use as a merchant ship by the Soviet Navy until 1976.

In 1977 it was bought by Far Eastern Shipping Co, Vladivostok and used as a transport ship until mid-1982.

At the end of 1982 the ship became the Ministry of the Fishing Industry and the ship was converted into a fishing storage.

She was decommissioned in 2000s and in 2003 was used as a storage ship in Vladivostok.

References

 

Liberty ships
Ships built in California
1943 ships